The 1989 Auburn Tigers football team represented Auburn University in the 1989 NCAA Division I-A football season.  Coached by Pat Dye, the team finished the season with a 10–2 record and won their third straight SEC title.  On December 2, Alabama visited Auburn on their home campus for the first time in the history of the Iron Bowl.  Auburn won, 30–20, went on to beat Ohio State in the Hall of Fame Bowl, and finished the season ranked #6 in both major polls.

Schedule

Personnel

Rankings

Season summary

Pacific 
The season opener proved to be one of the most lopsided affairs Auburn had seen in years. On the first play from scrimmage, wide receiver Alexander Wright scored on a 78-yard screen play and the Tigers never looked back. They scored on 5 of their first 7 drives and held a 35–0 lead at halftime intermission. The defense held Pacific to 92 yards of total offense and 4 first downs. Alexander Wright caught 5 passes for 263 yards and 4 scores. His performance earned him National Offensive Player of the Week honors.

Southern Mississippi
Auburn ditched the air attack that worked to perfection against Pacific and relied on a more traditional downhill running game to wear down the Eagles. Implementing a two-back game plan, tailback James Joseph ran for 149 yards on 24 carries and counterpart Stacy Danley picked up 102 on 21 touches. The defense held Southern and their Heisman hopeful quarterback Brett Favre to 174 yards in a 24-3 victory. Lamar Rogers was named National Defensive Player of the Week for an effort that included 3 sacks, 3 tackles for loss, and a forced fumble.

at Tennessee
Pat Dye's defense surrendered over 350 yards on the ground, the most an Auburn defense had allowed in 13 years. 225 came from the legs of Volunteer running back Reggie Cobb, making him the first player to eclipse the 100-yard mark against the Tigers in three seasons. Despite the performance of the defensive front, Auburn still had a chance to tie late but Reggie Slack's fourth-down pass to Alexander Wright fell incomplete with 1:19 left.

at Kentucky
Quarterback Reggie Slack threw for 161 yards in the first half and tossed two 1st quarter touchdowns, a 24-yard strike to Greg Taylor and a 34-yard bomb to Pedro Cherry, to give Auburn a 14-0 lead. The scrappy Wildcats continued to put up a fight in the second half, narrowing the margin to 14-6 in the 3rd quarter and 21-12 in the 4th, but a late 40-yard field goal from the leg of Win Lyle was the clincher.

LSU 
In a classic defensive slug fest, both offenses were held in check for most of the afternoon. The 1st half ended in a 3-3 stand still and the Bengal Tigers had managed to score a field goal on the opening drive of the third quarter. LSU held on to their 6-3 advantage well into the final 15 minutes of play. But the field position battle was titled when wide out Shane Wasden fielded a punt at the Auburn 30 and scampered up the sidelines to the LSU 37. Seven plays later, Stacy Danley bulldozed into the end zone from 1 yard out to take a 10-6 lead with 6:07 left in the game. From here, the Tiger defense stiffened and Danley was able to burn out the rest of the clock on the ensuing possession.

at Florida State
A 16-point second quarter doomed the visiting Tigers as Florida State was able to build a 22-3 lead going into the second half. The Seminoles were held off the scoreboard the rest of the night, but Auburn was only able to muster two scores and 265 yards as they fell 22-14 in Tallahassee.

Mississippi State
On his 22nd birthday, James Joseph gutted the Bulldog defense for 172 yards on a hefty 35 carries. Auburn played ball control for most of the afternoon, calling mostly running plays and only passing 14 times. Slack scored on a bootleg in the 3rd quarter and Joseph plunged in from 1-yard out to put it away in the 4th as the Tigers held on to a 14-0 homecoming win.

Florida

Few moments in Jordan-Hare history have been as thrilling as Auburn's 10-7 win in 1989 over the Florida Gators. The Tiger offense had sputtered for most of the night but still found themselves in the game late, down 7-3, due to a heroic effort from the Auburn defense. The nation's leading rusher, Emmitt Smith, was held to just 86 yards and the visitors could only mustered 7 points. It still looked like it was going to be enough when Auburn was faced with a 4th down and 11 on the Florida 25 with 0:26 left in the game. That's when quarterback Reggie Slack hit wide receiver Shane Wasden in the right corner of the end zone to take a 10-7 lead and keep Auburn's SEC title hopes alive. Linebacker Quentin Riggins was awarded National Defensive Player of the Week for his 23-tackle performance.

Louisiana Tech
Auburn benefited from a second quarter explosion that yielded 28 points in 2:29 minutes of play to trump vising Tech 38-23. With the score standing at 10-7, freshman sensation Darrell "Lectron" Williams darted through the Bulldog defense for 36 yards and a score to put the tally at 14-10. After forcing a three-n-out, Auburn scored on the second play of their next possession on a 37-yard pass from Slack to Wright to increase the margin to 21-10. Then after La Tech fumbled ensuing kickoff, Wright scored from 14 yards out on the next play on a reverse. Then after Tech regained possession, Craig Ogletree intercepted a Bulldog pass on the first play from scrimmage and Williams ran it in from 15 yards out on the following play. In less than three minutes, Auburn went from trailing 10-7 to leading 35-10.

at Georgia
Auburn played their most complete game of the season against Georgia, out gaining the Dogs 468-221 and dominating the time of possession. The Tigers mounted 17-0 first half lead and played keep away for the remaining 30 minutes. Lectron Williams ran for 128 yards on 26 carries as James Joseph was nursing an injury. Defensively, Craig Ogletree had one of the finest games of his career with 11 total tackles and 9 quarterback pressures and John Wiley earned SEC Defensive Player of the Week honors with two red zone interceptions.

Alabama
In what is known as the most emotional day in Auburn football history, Alabama was forced to play Auburn in Auburn for the first time ever. The Tide were 10-0, ranked #2, and eyeing a national championship match up with Miami. Auburn had something at stake as well - a third straight SEC title. In front of a national audience and roaring crowd of 86,000, the Tigers downed 'Bama by the count of 30-20. Stacy Danley had a huge afternoon with 170 yards on 28 carries and Lectron Williams had a monumental 12-yard touchdown scamper to put Auburn ahead 24-10 in the 4th quarter. The Tide managed somewhat of a comeback, cutting the lead to 27-20 late, but a 34-yard Lyle field goal with 30 seconds left iced the victory.

Hall of Fame Bowl (vs Ohio State)

The Tigers responded to a 14-3 first half deficit to rout the Buckeyes in the Hall of Fame Bowl. Greg Taylor caught two touchdowns from Slack and Danley wore out the opposing defense as Auburn rode a 28-point unanswered run to close out a 31-14 victory and a 10-2 campaign.

References

Auburn
Auburn Tigers football seasons
ReliaQuest Bowl champion seasons
Auburn Tigers football